There are three types of incorporated municipalities in the Capital District of the U.S. state of New York: Cities, towns, and villages. In the State of New York, all the land located in a county is either in a city, in a town, or in an Indian Reservation. New York villages are located within one or more towns and may cross town or county lines. There are 11 counties in the Capital District comprising 13 cities, 143 towns, and 62 villages. The counties are Albany, Columbia, Greene, Fulton, Montgomery, Rensselaer, Saratoga, Schenectady, Schoharie, Warren, and Washington. The village of Green Island is coterminous with the town of the same name. Ballston Spa, Broadalbin, Cambridge, Chatham, Fort Plain, Greenwich, Nassau, and Valley Falls are villages that cross into two towns. The village of Dolgeville is partly in Fulton County, but is mostly in Herkimer County, which is part of the Utica-Rome Metropolitan Statistical Area.

Ten of the eleven counties of the Capital District make up two Metropolitan Statistical Areas (MSA) and three Micropolitan Statistical Areas (µSA); together, those five statistical areas make up the Albany-Schenectady-Amsterdam Combined Statistical Area. Albany, Rensselaer, Saratoga, Schenectady, and Schoharie Counties make up the Albany-Schenectady-Troy MSA; while Warren and Washington counties are the constituent counties of the Glens Falls MSA. Fulton County is the sole county in the Gloversville µSA, Montgomery County is the Amsterdam µSA, and Columbia County is the Hudson µSA. Greene County is not in any CSA, MSA, or µSA.

Incorporated cities, towns, and villages

See also
Timeline of town creation in New York's Capital District
Administrative divisions of New York
List of cities in New York
List of towns in New York
List of villages in New York

References

Capital District (New York)